Hoilungia hongkongensis is a species in the phylum Placozoa. The organism appears superficially similar to Trichoplax adhaerens, but genetic analysis of its mitochondrial DNA shows numerous differences. It was discovered in brackish water from mangrove swamps in Hong Kong. These organisms are generally found in the biofilm surfaces in tropical and subtropical environments. Phylogenetically, they are placed closest to cnidarians. They are diploblastic animals and are believed to have dorso-ventral polarity along top and bottom body layers. Their body is overtly similar to oral-aboral axis of cnidarians. They feed from lower tissue layer which has various peptidergic gland cells. They feed on algae, bacteria, yeast and other byproducts of biofilms. They reproduce asexually through binary fission and there is also some evidence of sexual reproduction. The Hoilungia hongkongensis genome adds support to the phylogenetic placement of the Placozoa in the animal tree of life

Natural history
Over a long time, only a single species of placozoan clades, Trichoplax adhaerens, was described but lately, it has been found that the relatively newer species, Hoilungia hongkongensis is a result of reproductive isolation mechanism of speciation.

Nitric oxide signaling
Hoilungia and Trichoplax are considered one of the earliest branching animal lineages, and have relatively simple morphologies their complexity of NO-cGMP-mediated signaling is greater to those in vertebrates. This evidence has been found in their DNA by experimentation using ultra-sensitive capillary electrophoresis assays.

Etymology
The genus name is derived from the phrase "hoi lung", which means "sea dragon" in Cantonese.

Structure 
The body axis of Trichoplax and the new placozoan species, Hoilungia hongkongensis, is overtly similar to the oral–aboral axis of cnidarians.

References 

Placozoa
Fauna of Hong Kong
Monotypic animal genera
Animals described in 2018
Parazoa